Tommy Koh Thong Bee  (born 12 November 1937) is a Singaporean diplomat, lawyer, professor and author who served as Singapore's Permanent Representative to the United Nations between 1968 and 1971.

Early life and education
Koh was born in Singapore on 12 November 1937. His father was originally from Tong'an, Fujian and his mother was from Shanghai. He attended from Serangoon Secondary School and Raffles Institution before graduating from the University of Malaya in Singapore (now the National University of Singapore) with a Bachelor of Laws with first class honours degree. 

He subsequently went on to complete a Master of Laws degree at Harvard University, where he was classmate with Ngiam Tong Dow, and a Graduate Diploma in criminology at the University of Cambridge. 

He was conferred a full professorship in 1977. Koh was awarded honorary Doctor of Laws degrees from Yale University and Monash University. He has also received awards from Columbia University, Stanford University, Georgetown University, the Fletcher School of Law and Diplomacy at Tufts University, and Curtin University.

Career
Koh is an international law professor, action and Ambassador-at-Large for the Singaporean government. He presently serves as Special Adviser at the Institute of Policy Studies, Chairman of the National Heritage Board, Chairman of the Governing Board of the Centre for International Law, and Rector of Tembusu College at the National University of Singapore. He is on secondment from the National University of Singapore Faculty of Law.

Koh was President of the Third United Nations Conference on the Law of the Sea, 1980–1982. Lax and Sebenius present Koh and his efforts in getting the Convention passed, as an example of successful negotiating. 1990 to 1992 he served as Chairman of the Main Committee of the UN Conference on Environment and Development, where he presided over the negotiations on Agenda 21. He has also served as Singapore's ambassador to the United Nations and the United States.

Koh was the first Executive Director of the Asia-Europe Foundation (ASEF), established in Singapore in 1997 by the countries of the Asia-Europe Meeting (ASEM).

On 9 August 2008, Koh was conferred with the Order of Nila Utama (First Class) by the Singaporean government for his outstanding contributions in the Singapore legislative team representing Singapore in the Pedra Branca dispute case with the Malaysian government.

In 2014, Koh received the Great Negotiator Award from Program on Negotiation at Harvard Law School for his multiple contributions to diplomacy, most notably his work as chief negotiator for the United States–Singapore Free Trade Agreement, his work around developing the Association of Southeast Asian Nations, his important efforts in resolving territorial and humanitarian disputes in the Baltics and Asia, and his success in leading both the Third UN Conference on the Law of the Sea and the UN Conference on Environment and Development (also known as the Rio Earth Summit).

In September 2018, via a Facebook post, Tommy Koh encouraged the LGBT communities of Singapore to challenge Section 377A of the Penal Code which criminalise same-sex intercourse between men.

Koh is on the panel of mediators for Singapore International Mediation Centre.

Selected writings
 Tommy Koh, Constitution of the Oceans, UNCLOS December 1982,  accessed 20 May 2017
 Tommy Koh, Five Years After Rio:Some Personal Reflections, UN Chronicle 1997, accessed at Essay 29 August 2006
 Tommy T.B. Koh and Amitav Acharya (ed.), The Quest for World Order: Perspectives of a Pragmatic Idealist, Times Academic Press, Singapore, 1997 
 Tommy Koh, Five Years After Rio:Some Personal Reflections, UN Chronicle 1997, accessed at Essay 29 August 2006
 
 
 
 
 
 Tommy T.B. Koh & Hernaikh Singh (eds), India On Our Minds: Essays By Tharman Shanmugaratnam And 50 Singaporean Friends Of India, World Scientific Publishing, 2021.

Honours and awards
 1961: Adrian Clarke Memorial Medal, University of Malaya (Singapore)
 1961: Leow Chia Heng Prize, University of Malaya (Singapore)
 1963: Fulbright Student, Master of Laws (LLM), Harvard University
 1971: Public Service Star (Bintang Bakti Masyarakat), Singapore
 1976: International Visitors Leadership Program (IVLP), Washington DC
 1979: Meritorious Service Medal (Pingat Jasa Gemilang), Singapore
 1984: Wolfgang Friedman Award, Columbia University Law School, New York
 1984: Honorary Doctor of Laws (LL.D), Yale University, Connecticut
 1985: Jackson H. Ralston Prize, Stanford Law School, California
 1985: Annual Award of the Asia Society, New York
 1987: International Service Award, Fletcher School of Law and Diplomacy, Tufts University, USA
 1987: Jit Trainor Award for Distinction in Diplomacy, Georgetown University, USA
 1990: Distinguished Service Order Award (Darjah Utama Bakti Cemerlang), Singapore
 1993: Commander, Order of the Golden Ark, The Netherlands
 1996: Elizabeth Haub Prize for Environmental Law, University of Brussels
 1997: Grand Cross of the Order of Bernardo O'Higgins, Chile
 1998: Fok Ying Tung Southeast Asia Prize, Fok Ying Tung Foundation, Hong Kong (29 May)
 2000: Commander, First Class, of the Order of the Lion of Finland
 2000: John Curtin Medal, Curtin University of Technology, Western Australia
 2000: Grand Officer, Order of Merit of the Grand Duchy of Luxembourg
 2000: Distinguished Service to Arts Education, LASALLE-SIA College Award
 2001: Officer in the Légion d'honneur, President of the French Republic
 2003: Peace and Commerce Award for efforts at building trade links with the United States
 2004: Outstanding Service Award, National University of Singapore on 12 May
 2004: Encomienda of Isabel la Catolica, from His Majesty King Juan Carlos of Spain on 24 May
 2006: Champions of the Earth, United Nations Environment Programme
 2007: Tatler Leadership Award for Lifetime Achievement, Singapore Tatler magazine
 2008: Order of Nila Utama (First Class)
 2009: Order of the Rising Sun, Gold and Silver Star, 2009 (Japan).
 2014: Great Negotiator Award, 2014 (Harvard Law School/Harvard Kennedy School).
 2018: Padma Shri, India's fourth highest civilian honour

Lectures
 The Art and Science of Chairing Major Inter-governmental Conferences in the Lecture Series of the United Nations Audiovisual Library of International Law
 The Negotiating Process of UNCLOS III in the Lecture Series of the United Nations Audiovisual Library of International Law
 Straits Used for International Navigation in the Lecture Series of the United Nations Audiovisual Library of International Law

Personal life 
Tommy Koh is married to Poh Siew Aing. They have two sons, Aun and Wei.

See also
 Practical idealism
 Koh, Buck Song (1996), Interview with Professor Tommy Koh in The Arts in Singapore, 1996, Singapore: National Arts Council and Accent Communications.

References

External links
 Bio details at Institute of Policy Studies, Singapore

1937 births
Academic staff of the National University of Singapore Faculty of Law
Ambassadors of Singapore to the United States
Commanders First Class of the Order of the Lion of Finland
Grand Officers of the Order of Merit of the Grand Duchy of Luxembourg
Harvard Law School alumni
Living people
Recipients of the Darjah Utama Bakti Cemerlang
Recipients of the Darjah Utama Nila Utama
Permanent Representatives of Singapore to the United Nations
Raffles Institution alumni
Recipients of the Order of the Rising Sun, 2nd class
Saint Joseph's Institution, Singapore alumni
Singaporean diplomats
20th-century Singaporean lawyers
Singaporean people of Hokkien descent
Recipients of the Padma Shri in public affairs
21st-century Singaporean lawyers